El Protector may refer to:
 IWRG El Protector, an annual lucha libre tournament
 El Protector (2012)
 El Protector (2013)
 Torrente 3: El protector, a 2005 Spanish black comedy film

See also 
 Protector (disambiguation)